Gabriel Antonio Cruz Padilla (born 1981 in Bayamón, Puerto Rico), popularly known as Wise or ("Wise" The Gold Pen, formerly Wise Da 'Gangsta'), is a composer, singer and producer in Puerto Rico.

He started his career as a composer of different musical genres, among which we can mention, salsa, merengue, Latin pop, reggaeton, trap, and urban music, among others.

In his career as a composer, he consolidates as the "Hit Maker" of more success in the Tropical and Urban genre industry. His compositions are perceived as a guarantee to success; statistics certify his songs with a 96% chance of placing among the top 10 positions in the radio and sales lists. In the last few years, out of fifteen topics scrutinized, eleven songs of WISE authorship reached the first place within the prestigious Billboard magazine lists in 4 categories: Hot Latin Song, Latin Rhythm Airplay, Latin Tropical Airplay and Latin Pop Airplay. With these fifteen songs he also achieved 27 positions among the first 10 places on these billboards. WISE is president and owner of "The Gold Pen Music llc." in which he currently works with new talents.

Musical career

"The Gold Pen", as the well-known singer-songwriter has created emblematic and successful themes that add to the legacy of this young musical genius, as the only composer to simultaneously place five songs in the top positions on the Billboard. Currently, WISE is heard on international radios with new hits under his authorship, such as "Hoy lo siento", a song that has become the most played on nationwide radio, occupying the first positions internationally interpreted by Zion and Lennox feat. Tony Dize, as well as with "Diosa De Los Corazones" played by RKM and Ken-y, Arcangel, Zion and Lennox, another example of the way in which WISE reaches the number one position in the prestigious lists of Billboard as a guarantee of your work Some topics composed by Wise such as:

Song credits

Discography
 1997: La Vieja Escuela Vol. 1
 1998: Live
 1999: Da' Moda
 2003: Raggae Moon
 2004: Da' Album
 2005: Da' Klasic
 2014: The Gold Pen
 2015: 14F el Album
 2016: Los Eleven

References

External links
http://www.elcorillord.com/?p=1359
http://www.vocero.com/noticias.asp?s=Escenario&n=89589
http://www.ascap.com/playback/2007/spring/faces_places/latin/wise.html
http://www.wisethegoldpen.com/

Puerto Rican singer-songwriters
Living people
1980 births
Gold Star Records artists
Latin music songwriters
21st-century American singers